Joop van Wijk (born 1950, Hoorn) is a Dutch documentary film director and owner of Molenwiek Film.

List of documentary films
 Passage - A Boatmovie  (2016) producer
 Homeland (2010) associate producer
 Landscapes Unknown (2007) producer
 Echoes of War (2005) director and producer
 Shadowplay (2001) associate producer
 The daily nation (2000) co-director and co-producer together with Hillie Molenaar
 Crossroads (1997) co-director together with Hillie Molenaar
 Isingiro Hospital (1993) co-director and co-producer together with Hillie Molenaar
 Cannot run away (1988) co-director and co-producer together with Hillie Molenaar
 Dochters van de Nijl (1982) co-director and co-producer together with Hillie Molenaar

External links

References

1950 births
Living people
Dutch documentary filmmakers
Dutch documentary film directors
Dutch documentary film producers
Dutch film directors
People from Hoorn
20th-century Dutch people